Carlos Enrique Díaz Sáenz Valiente (25 January 1917 – 14 February 1956) was an Argentine sport shooter and racing driver . He was born in Mar del Plata, Argentina. He won the silver medal in 25 metre rapid fire pistol at the 1948 Summer Olympics in London. He competed at the 1952 Summer Olympics in Helsinki, where he placed fourth. Valiente also won the World Championship in 1947. He won the 1955 Buenos Aires 1000 Km sport cars race (co drove José María Ibañez) driving a Ferrari 375 plus.

References

External links
https://en.wikipedia.org/wiki/1000_km_Buenos_Aires

1917 births
1956 deaths
Argentine male sport shooters
Sportspeople from Mar del Plata
Argentine people of Spanish descent
Argentine racing drivers
Shooters at the 1948 Summer Olympics
Shooters at the 1952 Summer Olympics
Olympic shooters of Argentina
Olympic silver medalists for Argentina
Olympic medalists in shooting
Burials at La Recoleta Cemetery
Medalists at the 1948 Summer Olympics
Pan American Games gold medalists for Argentina
Pan American Games medalists in shooting
Shooters at the 1955 Pan American Games
Medalists at the 1955 Pan American Games